Troubky is a municipality and village in Přerov District in the Olomouc Region of the Czech Republic. It has about 2,000 inhabitants.

Geography
It lies in the Upper Morava Valley. It is situated at the left bank of the Bečva, near its confluence with the Morava.

History

The first written mention about Troubky is from 1348.

The municipality was severely affected by 1997 Central European flood, in which nine people died and 150 houses were destroyed. Thirteen years later, in 2010, was flooded again.

References

Villages in Přerov District